Duncan Ashley Paveling (born 8 June 1977) is an English screenwriter known for the independent film My Feral Heart as well as a cricketer active at the higher levels in the early 2000s.  Paveling served as a right-handed batsman who played primarily as a wicketkeeper in his List A matches.  He was born in Bristol.

Cricket
Paveling represented the Essex Cricket Board in 2 List A matches.  These came against the Sussex Cricket Board in the 1st round of the 2002 Cheltenham & Gloucester Trophy which was held in 2001, and the Surrey Cricket Board in the 2nd round of the 2003 Cheltenham & Gloucester Trophy which was played in 2002.  In his 2 List A matches, he scored 15 runs at a batting average of 7.50, with a high score of 11.

He later played club cricket for Westcliff-on-Sea Cricket Club in Essex.

References

External links
Duncan Paveling at Cricinfo
Duncan Paveling at CricketArchive

1977 births
Living people
Cricketers from Bristol
English cricketers
Essex Cricket Board cricketers
English male screenwriters
Wicket-keepers